Liu Xiaochun (born 21 April 1974) is a Chinese rower. She competed in the women's single sculls event at the 1996 Summer Olympics.

References

1974 births
Living people
Chinese female rowers
Olympic rowers of China
Rowers at the 1996 Summer Olympics
Place of birth missing (living people)
Asian Games medalists in rowing
Rowers at the 1998 Asian Games
Asian Games gold medalists for China
Medalists at the 1998 Asian Games
20th-century Chinese women
21st-century Chinese women